Jean-Baptiste-François Pitra, OSB (1 August 1812 – 9 February 1889) was a French Catholic cardinal, archaeologist and theologian.

He was born in Champforgeuil. Joining the Benedictine Order, he entered the Abbey of Solesmes in 1842, and was collaborator of Abbe Migne in the latter's Patrologia latina and Patrologia Graeca. He was created cardinal in 1863, and was given the titular church of San Callisto in 1867, before being appointed librarian of the Vatican Library in 1869. He is especially noteworthy for his great archaeological discoveries, including the Inscription of Autun, and is the author of numerous works on archaeological, theological, and historical subjects.

Pitra died in Rome.

Works

See also
List of Roman Catholic scientist-clerics

Notes

References

1812 births
1889 deaths
19th-century French cardinals
Cardinal-bishops of Frascati
Cardinal-bishops of Porto
French Benedictines
Benedictine cardinals
Cardinals created by Pope Pius IX
Catholic clergy scientists
French archaeologists